These are the matches Fiorentina have played in European football competitions. The club's first entry into European competitions was in the 1956–57 European Cup, with their only trophy coming in the 1960–61 European Cup Winners' Cup.

UEFA-organised seasonal competitions
Fiorentina's score listed first.

European Cup / UEFA Champions League

European Cup Winners' Cup / UEFA Cup Winners' Cup

UEFA Cup / UEFA Europa League

UEFA Europa Conference League

FIFA-only recognized seasonal competitions

Inter-Cities Fairs Cup

Overall record

By competition

Notes and references

Europe
Fiorentina